Sybil Margaret Thomas, Viscountess Rhondda,  (née Haig; 25 February 1857 – 11 March 1941) was a British suffragette, feminist, and philanthropist.

Early life and marriage
She was born in Brighton, the daughter of George Augustus Haig, a merchant and landowner from Pen Ithon, Radnorshire, Wales, and his wife, Anne Eliza Fell. Her father was of Scottish descent and was a cousin of Douglas Haig. Her sister was the suffragette Janet Boyd.

On 27 June 1882 she married David Alfred Thomas, a wealthy Welsh industrialist who later became Liberal Member of Parliament for Merthyr Boroughs. Their principal residence was Llanwern, Monmouthshire.

Politics
In the 1890s Sybil Thomas became president of the Welsh Union of Women's Liberal Associations, which was strongly feminist and pro-female suffrage. She was also a prominent moderate in the National Union of Women's Suffrage Societies. Her sisters Janet and Charlotte were also prominent suffragettes and both went to prison for acts of violence in the name of the cause. Her daughter, Margaret Haig Thomas, became one of the most prominent British feminists of the inter-war years. Under their influence, Sybil joined the more militant Women's Social and Political Union. In 1914 she was sentenced to one day's imprisonment after holding a public meeting outside the Houses of Parliament.

First World War
In 1916 her husband was ennobled as Baron Rhondda. During the First World War, Lady Rhondda served as chairman of the Women's Advisory Committee of the National War Savings Committee and turned part of Llanwern into a military hospital, as well as assisting her husband in his war work (as Food Controller from 1917–18). 

In 1918 her husband became Viscount Rhondda. He died shortly afterwards and Lady Rhondda devoted the rest of her life to feminist and philanthropic projects.

Honours
Lady Rhondda was appointed Dame Commander of the Order of the British Empire (DBE) in the 1920 civilian war honours for her work with the National War Savings Committee. She died on 11 March 1941.

Footnotes

References
Biography, Oxford Dictionary of National Biography
Obituary, The Times, 12 March 1941

 
1857 births
1941 deaths
People from Brighton
People from Radnorshire
British suffragists
British feminists
British philanthropists
Dames Commander of the Order of the British Empire
British viscountesses
Women of the Victorian era
British women in World War I
Members of the Workers' Socialist Federation
Socialist feminists